John Paul or variant may refer to:

People
Given name "John Paul"
 John Paul (given name), lists bearers of the name, and equivalent names in other languages
 Known as "John Paul" without surname:
 Pope John Paul I (1912–1978)
 Pope John Paul II (1920–2005)
 John Paul Puthusery (born 1950), Malayalam screenwriter usually known as "John Paul"

Given name "Johnpaul"
 Johnpaul George, Indian Malayalam-language filmmaker
 Johnpaul Jones (born 1941) U.S. architect

Given name "John", surname "Paul"
John Paul (actor) (1921–1995), British actor
John Paul (artist) (1804–1887), English painter
John Paul (colonial administrator) (1916–2004), British government official
John Paul (footballer), 19th century British footballer
John Paul (judge) (1839–1901), US politician and judge
John Paul Jr. (judge) (1883–1964), US politician and judge
John Paul (minister) (1795–1873), Scottish minister
John Paul (pioneer) (1758–1830), US politician and city founder
John Paul (priest) (1928–2009), Scottish Anglican Dean of Moray, Ross and Caithness
John Paul (screenwriter) (1950-2022), Indian screenwriter
John Paul Sr. (racing driver) (1939–????), American automobile racing driver
John Paul Jr. (racing driver) (1960–2020), American automobile racing driver
John Joseph Paul (1918–2006), American Roman Catholic bishop
John R. Paul (1893–1971), American virologist
John Thomas Paul (1874–1964), New Zealand compositor, trade unionist, politician, editor, journalist and censor
John Paul Jones (1747–1792), born "John Paul"; American naval commander in the Revolutionary War

Other uses
 John Paul II (disambiguation)
 Pope John Paul (disambiguation)
 John Paul Jones (disambiguation)

See also

 John (disambiguation)
 Paul (disambiguation)
 John and Paul (disambiguation)
 Paul John (disambiguation)
 Ioannes Paulus (disambiguation)
 Giovanni Paolo (disambiguation)
 Jan Pawel (disambiguation)
 Jean-Paul (disambiguation)
 João Paulo (disambiguation), a given name
 Juan Pablo, a name